Riccarton Bush is in the city of Christchurch in the suburb of Riccarton, New Zealand. The bush is a small remnant of lowland kahikatea floodplain forest on the Canterbury Plains. It has played an important part in the history of entomology in New Zealand with many famous entomologists studying the insects and spiders found there. The order of Lepidoptera has been well studied; of the families found in New Zealand 70% have been collected in the bush.

The majority of families that make up the order of Lepidoptera are moths. This page provides a link to individual species that have been collected from Riccarton Bush.

Geometridae
Asaphodes aegrota Butler, 1879
Austrocidaria similata Walker, 1862
Chalastra ochrea Howes, 1911
Chloroclystis filata (filata moth) Guenee, 1857
Declana floccosa (forest semilooper) Walker, 1858
Declana niveata Butler, 1879
Epiphryne undosata C. Felder, R. Felder & Rogenhofer, 1875
Epiphryne verriculata (cabbage tree moth) C. Felder, R. Felder & Rogenhofer, 1875
Gellonia dejectaria (brown evening moth) Walker, 1860
Helastia cinerearia Doubleday in White and Doubleday, 1843
Homodotis megaspilata Walker, 1862
Orthoclydon praefectata (Walker, 1861)
Pseudocoremia fenerata C. Felder, R. Felder & Rogenhofer, 1875
Pseudocoremia suavis (common forest looper) Butler, 1879
Sestra humeraria Walker, 1861
Xanthorhoe semifissata Walker, 1862
Xyridacma alectoraria Walker, 1860
Xyridacma ustaria Walker, 1863

References

Riccarton Bush
Moths, Riccarton Bush
Riccarton, New Zealand